Fluidø is a 2017 German science fiction film directed by Shu Lea Cheang. It was screened in the Panorama section at the 67th Berlin International Film Festival.

Set in the 2060s, the film depicts a world in which HIV/AIDS has been fully eradicated. In some people, however, the virus has mutated into a gene which can be extracted to create a new psychoactive drug, leading to the creation of an extensive underground network of human trafficking to capture the carriers of this mutation in order to manufacture the drug.

Cast
 Caprice Crawford as Madame X
 William E. Morris as DI for Diva
 Kristina Marlen as Eva

References

External links
 

2017 films
2017 science fiction films
2017 LGBT-related films
Gay-related films
German science fiction films
English-language German films
German LGBT-related films
LGBT-related science fiction films
HIV/AIDS in German films
2010s English-language films
2010s German films